Ronald Holmes (born 22 November 1934) is a former Jamaican boxer. He competed in the men's light heavyweight event at the 1964 Summer Olympics. Holmes won a silver medal at the 1963 Pan American Games and a gold medal at the 1962 Central American and Caribbean Games.

References

1934 births
Living people
Light-heavyweight boxers
Jamaican male boxers
Olympic boxers of Jamaica
Boxers at the 1964 Summer Olympics
Boxers at the 1963 Pan American Games
Pan American Games silver medalists for Jamaica
Pan American Games medalists in boxing
Boxers at the 1962 British Empire and Commonwealth Games
Commonwealth Games competitors for Jamaica
Competitors at the 1962 Central American and Caribbean Games
Central American and Caribbean Games gold medalists for Jamaica
Place of birth missing (living people)
Central American and Caribbean Games medalists in boxing
Medalists at the 1963 Pan American Games
20th-century Jamaican people
21st-century Jamaican people